Ouro-Nimini Tchagnirou (born 31 December 1977) is a Togolese football goalkeeper.

He is a member of the national team, and was called up to the 2006 World Cup.

References

External links

1977 births
Living people
Togolese footballers
Togolese expatriate footballers
Togo international footballers
Djoliba AC players
2002 African Cup of Nations players
2006 Africa Cup of Nations players
2006 FIFA World Cup players
Stade Malien players
Expatriate footballers in Mali
CO de Bamako players
Association football goalkeepers
AC Semassi FC players
21st-century Togolese people